Digital Video Broadcasting - Satellite - Second Generation (DVB-S2) is a digital television broadcast standard that has been designed as a successor for the popular DVB-S system. It was developed in 2003 by the Digital Video Broadcasting Project, an international industry consortium, and ratified by ETSI (EN 302307) in March 2005. The standard is based on, and improves upon DVB-S and the electronic news-gathering (or Digital Satellite News Gathering) system, used by mobile units for sending sounds and images from remote locations worldwide back to their home television stations.

DVB-S2 is designed for broadcast services including standard and HDTV, interactive services including Internet access, and (professional) data content distribution. The development of DVB-S2 coincided with the introduction of HDTV and H.264 (MPEG-4 AVC) video codecs.

Two new key features that were added compared to the DVB-S standard are:
 A powerful coding scheme based on a modern LDPC code. For low encoding complexity, the LDPC codes chosen have a special structure, also known as Irregular Repeat-Accumulate codes. 
 VCM (Variable Coding and Modulation) and ACM (Adaptive Coding and Modulation) modes, which allow optimizing bandwidth utilization by dynamically changing transmission parameters.

Other features include enhanced modulation schemes up to 32APSK, additional code rates, and the introduction of a generic transport mechanism for IP packet data including MPEG-4 audio–video streams, while supporting backward compatibility with existing MPEG-2 TS based transmission.

DVB-S2 achieves significantly better performance than its predecessors – mainly allowing for an increase of available bitrate over the same satellite transponder bandwidth. The measured DVB-S2 performance gain over DVB-S is around 30% at the same satellite transponder bandwidth and emitted signal power. When the contribution of improvements in video compression is added, an (MPEG-4 AVC) HDTV service can now be delivered in the same bandwidth that supported an early DVB-S based MPEG-2 SDTV service only a decade before.

In March 2014, DVB-S2X specification has been published by DVB Project as an optional extension adding further improvements.

Main features 
 Direct input of one or more MPEG-2 Transport Streams (TS). MPEG-TS is supported using a compatibility mode.
 The native stream format for DVB-S2 is called Generic Stream (GS), and can be used to efficiently carry IP-based data, including MPEG-4 AVC/H.264 services.
 Backward compatibility to DVB-S, intended for end users, and DVB-DSNG, used for backhauls and electronic news gathering.
 Variable coding and modulation (VCM) to optimize bandwidth utilization based on the priority of the input data; e.g., SDTV could be delivered using a more robust setting than the corresponding HDTV service.
 Adaptive coding and modulation (ACM) to allow flexibly adapting transmission parameters to the reception conditions of terminals, e.g., switching to a lower code rate during fading.
 Four modulation modes:
 QPSK and 8PSK are proposed for broadcast applications, and can be used in non-linear transponders driven near to saturation.
 16APSK and  32APSK are used mainly for professional, semi-linear applications, but can also be used for broadcasting though they require a higher level of available C/N and an adoption of advanced pre-distortion methods in the uplink station in order to minimize the effect of transponder nonlinearity.
 Improved rolloff: α = 0.20 and α = 0.25 in addition to the roll-off of DVB-S α = 0.35.
 Improved coding: a modern large LDPC code is concatenated with an outer BCH code to achieve quasi-error-free (QEF) reception conditions on an AWGN channel. The outer code is introduced to avoid error floors at low bit-error rates. A single forward error correction  or FEC frame may have either 64,800 bits (normal) or 16,200 bits (short). If VCM or ACM is used, the broadcast can be a combination of normal and short frames.
 Several code rates for flexible configuration of transmission parameters: 1/4, 1/3, 2/5, 1/2, 3/5, 2/3, 3/4, 4/5, 5/6, 6/7, 8/9, and 9/10. Code rates 1/4, 1/3, and 2/5 have been introduced for exceptionally poor reception conditions in combination with QPSK modulation. Encoding values 8/9 and 9/10 behave poorly under marginal link conditions (where the signal level is below the noise level). However, with targeted spot Ku or Ka band downlinks these code rates may be recommended to prevent out-of-region viewing for copyright or cultural reasons.
 Optional input stream synchronization to provide a constant end-to-end delay.

Depending on code rate and modulation, the system can operate at a C/N between −2.4 dB (QPSK, 1/4) and 16 dB (32APSK, 9/10) with a quasi-error free goal of a 10−7 TS packet error rate. Distance to the Shannon limit ranges from 0.7 dB to 1.2 dB.

Modes and features of DVB-S2 in comparison to DVB-S:

Use cases 
Envisaged scenarios for DVB-S2 by the standard document are:

 Broadcasting television services in SDTV or HDTV. Optionally, this transmission may be backwards compatible with DVB-S, but does not benefit from the 30% extra bandwidth.
 Interactive services including Internet access. Data generated by the user may be sent by cable (copper/fibre optic), mobile wireless, or satellite uplink (DVB-RCS).
 Professional applications, where data must be multiplexed in real time and then broadcast in the VHF/UHF band (e.g., digital TV contribution, satellite news gathering). These transmissions are not intended for the average viewer.
 Large-scale data content distribution. These include point-to-point and multicast services, as well as transmission to head-ends for (re-)distribution over other media.

Improvements over DVB-S 
DVB-S2 is 30% more efficient than DVB-S. It allows a wider range of applications combining DVB-S features (for household tasks), and DVB-DSNG (for professional tasks). DVB-S2 can adapt codification to maximize satellites resources value. It is compatible with last generation.

The main disadvantage, there are many millions of devices deployed using DVB-S over the world which has to be upgraded.

The next table compares both standards.

The DVB-S to DVB-S2 upgrade process 
The conversion process from DVB-S to DVB-S2 is being accelerated, due to the rapid increase of HDTV and introduction  of 3D-HDTV. The main factor slowing down this process is the need to replace or upgrade set-top boxes, or acquire TVs with DVB-S2 integrated tuners, which makes the transition slower for established operators.

Current direct-to-home broadcasters using DVB-S2 are:

Australia
 VAST fully replaced the previous DVB-S Aurora service from December 2013.  The extra capacity has allowed a Network Ten affiliate to be added along with five HD, seven SD multi-channels and limited advertisement targeting for viewers in DVB-T black-spot areas on Optus C1/D3 156E).
 Foxtel use this for their four HD downlinks on Optus D3 @ 156E.
Germany, Austria and Switzerland
 ARD and ZDF.
 HD+.
 Servus TV.
 Sky.
 SRG SSR.
Hungary
 Hello HD (also uses DVB-S for some SD and HD channels).
 Magyar Telekom.
 UPC Direct; also operates in Slovakia and the Czech Republic.
India
 Sun Direct is the first broadcaster in India commenced transmission of HD Channels on DVB-S2 way back in 2007.
 Airtel Digital TV.
 Videocon d2h.
 Dish TV for all its HD/SD channel transmissions via AsiaSat 5 and DVB-S is being used for transmissions via NSS-6..
 Tata Sky for its HD channel transmissions via INSAT-4A.
Bangladesh
 Maasranga Television for its SD/HD channel transmissions via APSTAR-7.
 GaanBangla, NexusTV as well as most other channels
Iran
 IRIB on Badr5 26°E and on Intelsat 902 62°E and on Eutelsat W3A 7°E.
 Gem Group on YahSat 1A 52.5°E.
Turkey
 Digiturk on Eutelsat W3A 7°E.
 D-Smart on Turksat 3A 42°E.
 TRT (HDTV feed only) on Turksat 3A 42°E.
 DTVH (HD feed only) on Turksat 3A 42°E.
United Kingdom and Ireland
 Sky Q
 BBC (for all its HD channels, which are part of the Sky and Freesat services).
 ITV; Central West and Meridian South variants of ITV HD only.
 STV (STV HD channel).
 Saorsat (only available in Ireland).

Romania
 Dolce operated by Romtelecom (now Telekom Romania), only for HD channels. For SD channels is using DVB-S. Backward compatibility, if subscribed to HD package. Service can only be accessed with proprietary Set-top-boxes. NDS Encrypted. Card paired with set top box. If You have a HD receiver from them, you are able to receive two HD channelsin basic package. Needs special antena for HD. 
 Focus Sat operated by UPC Romania, only for HD .SD remains in DVB-S ( except fashion TV SD). Can be used with a DVB-S receiver for SD channels, or DVB-S2 for SD and HD. May be used also with a CAM and a TV with built in DVB-S (for SD channels)or DVB-S2 (Both SD and HD) tuner and common interface slot. HD channels are offered on separate package, therefore aside a HD terminal (TV or STB), you need to pay this package. CONNAX CAS 7 Encryption. Card not paired with receiver.
 Orange TV operated by Orange Romania, only in DVB-S2 both SD and HD. Viaccess Encrypted. Only available with proprietary set top boxes. Card paired with set top box. Set top boxes are only HD, these channels are available from the cheapest package.
 Digi TV, operated by RCS & RDS (since March 2014). Until March 2014, only DVB-S, SD. Nagravision 3 Encrypted. Although it is said that the card and receiver are paired, some subscribers stated that the service can also be accessed with a TV with built in DVB-S/S2 tuner and common interface by using a CAM. However, Until March 2014, only SD channels were available. Needs special subscribing for HD. DVB-S is used in SD reception while DVB-S2 is used both for SD and HD.
Other countries
 Astro in Malaysia (currently only for HD channels; uses DVB-S for backwards compatibility with SD channels).
 Bell Satellite TV in Canada (experimentally).
 Canal+ in Spain.
 CanalDigitaal in the Netherlands (HD channels only + some SD channels on Astra 3 23.5°E).
 CanalSat in France.
 Cignal in Philippines.
 Claro TV Satelital in Guatemala, Honduras, El Salvador, Nicaragua and Dominican Republic.
 Cosmote TV in Greece.
 Dialog TV in Sri Lanka for HD channels and some SD channels; other SD channels use DVB-S.
 Digital+ in Spain (currently only for HD channels and only on Astra).
 DirecTV in the US using H.264/MPEG-4 AVC codec for local and some national HDTV channels (newer satellites).
 Dish Network in the US (new channels).
 DStv in South Africa for HD channels; SD channels use DVB-S.
 ENTV in Algeria since July 17th 2021.
 GVT TV in Brazil. (Available to current customers of the GVT ADSL and telephony services).
 HRT in Croatia (from December 1).
 meo in Portugal.
 nc+ in Poland.
 MTS and Platform HD in Russia.
 Sky Direct in Philippines.
 Sky HD in Italy.
 Skylife in South Korea.
 SKY PerfecTV! in Japan.
 Sky Network Television in New Zealand upgraded all its transponders on Optus D1 @ 160E to DVB-S2 in March 2019. This was previously only used for their HD channels.
 TopTV in South Africa (services launched May 1, 2010).
 Viasat in Ukraine.
 Vivacom in Bulgaria.
 VTC in Vietnam.
 Satellite BG in Bulgaria.

These broadcasters have used DVB-S2 in their internal broadcast distribution networks, but may not have instituted DVB-S2 transmissions for consumers.

Licensing 
Sisvel, a Luxembourg-based company, administers the licenses for patents applying to this standard, as well as other patent pools.

References

Sources 
 Digital Video Broadcasting (DVB); Second generation framing structure, channel coding and modulation systems for Broadcasting, Interactive Services, News Gathering and other broadband satellite applications (DVB-S2), ETSI EN 302 307, V1.2.1, April 2009.
 Digital Video Broadcasting (DVB) User guidelines for the second generation system for Broadcasting, Interactive Services, News Gathering and other broadband satellite applications (DVB-S2), ETSI TR 102 376, V1.1.1, February 2005.

 DVB-S2 – ready for lift off, article in the EBU technical review

External links

 Online Satellite Calculations
 Newtec DVB-S2(x) Calculator
 16APSK/32APSK STV0900A tests under Linux
IRA code paper

Digital Video Broadcasting
Satellite broadcasting
Television transmission standards

de:DVB-S#DVB-S2